Major General John Scott (1725–1775)  "of Balcomie and Scotstarvit" in Scotland, was a Scottish politician and senior British Army officer. He was nicknamed Pawky Scott (Pawky being in Scots dialect "sly, shrewd or one who tricks you").

Life
He was born at Balcomie House near Crail in Fife, the son of David Scott of Scotstarvit Tower and his wife Lucy Gordon.

He joined the British Army in 1741 as an ensign in the 12th Regiment of Foot and rose via different regiments to the rank of Major-general in 1770.

He served as Colonel of the 108th regiment of Foot from 1762 to 1763 and as Colonel of the 26th (Cameronian) Regiment of Foot from 1763 to his death.

He was the Member of Parliament (MP) for Caithness from 1754 to 1761, for Tain Burghs from 1761 to 1768, and for Fife from 1768 until his death on 7 December 1775.

Im 1766 he inherited Scotstarvit Tower on the death of his father.

Through a mix of skill and luck he is said to have gained £500,000 through gambling, over and above his other inheritances and military income. This is around £60 million in modern terms.

In 1766 he won a huge bet made with Sir Lawrence Dundas in which he won Dundas House (now the HQ of the Royal Bank of Scotland). Dundas negotiated that he instead built Scott a new house to the north, on the site of Provost George Drummond's house: and this house was called Bellevue Lodge. This became Scott's Edinburgh home.

A successful gambler, he purchased Denmylne Castle in Fife in 1772. Not requiring the castle itself he allowed it to fall into a state of disrepair.

He died at Scotstarvit in 1775.

Bellevue House was converted to the Edinburgh Excise House after his death. It was demolished in 1842 to facilitate the construction of Scotland Street tunnel underneath.

Gambling
George Devol asserted that -

Family
On 5 November 1770, he married Lady Mary Hay, daughter of the Earl of Errol, then 16 years old; they were divorced in 1771.  It is mentioned in one source that she eloped with another man.

He married secondly, on 5 June 1773 the Hon Margaret Dundas, daughter of Robert Dundas, of Arniston, the younger. They had three daughters:

Henrietta, born 1774, who married William Bentinck, 4th Duke of Portland;
Lucy, born 28 March 1775, who married Francis Stuart, 10th Earl of Moray;
Joan, born 15 March 1776 (three months after her father's death), who married George Canning.

References

External links
thepeerage.com

1725 births
1775 deaths
British Army generals
Cameronians officers
Members of the Parliament of Great Britain for Scottish constituencies
British MPs 1754–1761
British MPs 1761–1768
British MPs 1768–1774
British MPs 1774–1780